Zhang Zining (born 9 March 1996), known by her stage name Zining, is a Chinese singer. She was the main vocalist of Chinese girl group MERA before taking part in the survival show Produce 101. She debuted as a member of Rocket Girls 101 after finishing seventh on the show. Zining officially graduated from Rocket Girls 101 on June 23, 2020, 2 years after their formation. She now pursues a solo career.

Early life and education 
Zining was born in Chengdu, Sichuan, China. She majored in Music Performing (Vocal Performing) at the Communication University of China and graduated in June 2020.

Career

2017-2018: Debut with MERA 

On August 16, 2017, Zining was officially introduced as a member of 5-member Chinese girl group MERA under Mavericks Entertainment during a debut launch event in Beijing and the group released their first mini album "天生".

2018-2020: Produce 101 and Rocket Girls 101 

In 2018, Zining participated in the Chinese reality survival girl group show Produce 101 aired from April 21 to June 23 on Tencent Video. She finished seventh with 107,630,613 votes and successfully debuted as a member of Rocket Girls 101.

On August 9, 2018, Mavericks Entertainment released a statement with Yuehua Entertainment that Zining will be withdrawing from Rocket Girls 101 along with bandmates Meiqi and Xuanyi. However, on August 17, 2018, it was announced that they will be returning to the group after discussions with Tencent.

On January 27, 2019, Zining released her first self-composed song "我们" as the ending theme song for Rocket Girls 101's variety show "横冲直撞20岁" (Rampage to the Next Stop). She subsequently released three soundtracks, "萤火" as an ending theme song for drama "凤弈" (Legend of the Phoenix) on May 28, 2019, "虫儿飞" as an official cover of popular children's song on June 5, 2019 and "清平乐" as a promotional theme song for drama "长安十二时辰" (The Longest Day in Chang'an) on July 3, 2019, which was well received. As part of Rocket Girls 101's second album "立风", Zining released her solo song "自己" on July 12, 2019, in which she composed the lyrics for.

On February 8, 2020, Zining released "云边" as an ending theme song for drama "两世欢" (The Love Lasts Two Minds) and a week later on February 15, 2020, she released "不爱而别" as an insert song for drama "少主且慢行" (I've Fallen for You)''.'

2020-2021: Solo Career 
After graduating from Rocket Girls 101 on June 23, 2020, Zining now pursues a solo career.

Zining subsequently announced her first solo album "莫尔" (MORE) which consists of 12 songs that were released sequentially from 2020 to 2021. On July 14, 2020, she released "我想我不一样" as a preview song for her solo album. The second song from the album, "平行又交替", was released on August 12, 2020, and features renowned singer A-Lin. The next three songs, "爱转", "你的情歌" and "苏西的世界" were released as an EP on September 6, 2020. Subsequently, the next three songs, "愉快纪念", "必需品" and "深信不疑" were released on November 4, 2020, December 6, 2020 and December 22, 2020 respectively. In 2021, Zining released the ninth song on her first solo album, "波特兰灯塔" on January 9 in which she composed the lyrics for and the tenth song "Blue Eyes" on January 31 in which she composed for her cat named Airy. The eleventh song which she composed the lyrics for, "我们可能就这样", was released on March 7, 2021. On March 28, 2021, the last song in which Zining composed, "其实也还好", was released.

Other than songs from her own solo album, Zining released various official song covers and soundtracks for Chinese dramas and mobile games. Zining released an official cover of "孤单北半球" on July 4, 2020, as part of the "Reset Youth Project" and an official cover of "独家记忆" on August 23, 2020, as part of the "Record Project" by NetEase Music. On July 29, 2020, she released "不服" as an insert song for drama "穿越火线" (Cross Fire). On November 11, 2020, Zining released "无罪说" as an ending theme song for drama "目标人物" (Target Person) and on November 29, 2020, she released "你好，再见" as a promotional theme song for drama "最初的相遇，最后的别离" (To Love).

In 2021, Zining released "心里" as an insert song for drama "假日暖洋洋" (Vacation of Love) on January 17 and "对立面" as an insert song for drama "玲珑" (The Blessed Girl) on January 25. On February 1, 2021, she released "Fight For Love" as a theme song for Chinese mobile game "Game for Peace"and on February 4, 2021, she released "戏春令" as a theme song for Chinese mobile game "Xuan Yuan Sword: Long Wu Yun Shan". On February 6, 2020, Zining released "恋爱三分甜" as an ending theme song for drama "扑通扑通喜欢你" (Make My Heart Smile) and on February 19, 2020, she released "梦归尽" as an insert song for drama "赘婿" (My Heroic Husband). On March 27, 2021, Zining released "念未别" as an insert song for drama "玉昭令" (No Boundary) and on May 15, 2021, she released "I wanna see you now" as an ending theme song for drama "皮囊之下" (Ugly Beauty). She then released "月下" as a theme song for drama "花好月又圆" (Truth or Dare) on June 3, 2021.

In the second half of the year on July 18, 2021, she released "After You 关于你" as an ending theme song for drama "法医秦明之无声的证词" (Silent Evidence). On 8 September 2021, she released an official cover of "最爱" and on 15 November 2021, she released another official cover of "连名带姓".Subsequently, on 18 November 2021, she released "落笔成殇" as a theme song for drama "潇洒佳人淡淡妆" (Beautiful Girl With Light Make-up) and on 29 November 2021, she released "好人坏人" as an insert song for drama "半暖时光" (The Memory About You).Zining then released "化" under the "Game Project" on 16 December 2021 and "星星" as the theme song for drama "清风朗月花正开" (The Flowers Are Blooming) on 22 December 2021.

2022-Present: Solo Career 
In 2022, Zining announced the launch of her second solo album, "Rec. X". She released the first song titled "余生有你 (Remaining)" on 26 January 2022 and the second song titled "漂流" on 28 February 2022. She released the third song, "万毒不侵 (The Poison)" on her birthday on 9 March 2022  and fourth song, "Flee." on 22 April 2022. On 31 May 2022, she released the fifth song "淡水河 (Freedom)" and on 9 July 2022, she released her self-composed song named "2 SiX". On 9 August 2022, Zining released the seventh song "230am".

On 20 February 2022, Zining released "海风与晚星" as a single. She then released "等风吻你" as an ending theme song for drama "二进制恋爱" (Binary Love) on 27 May 2022 and "叙事诗" as an ending theme song for drama "妻子的选择" (Wife's Choice) on 5 June 2022.

On 21 July 2022 she released an official cover of "灰姑娘"  and on 4 August 2022, she released another official cover of "是否我真的一无所有". Zining then released "她觉得" as an insert song for drama "玫瑰之战" on 10 August 2022  and "黑白之间" as a promotional theme song for drama "罚罪" on 31 August 2022. On 13 September 2022 she released "拥抱你的心跳" as an opening theme song for drama "亲爱的生命".

Discography

Albums

Singles

Filmography

Television series

Television shows

Notes

References

External links 
 
 

1996 births
Living people
Rocket Girls 101 members
Produce 101 (Chinese TV series) contestants
Singers from Chengdu
Chinese Mandopop singers
Communication University of China alumni